The ARTGO Challenge Series was a late model short track racing series that ran in the Midwestern United States from 1975 until 1998.  Many race car drivers used the ARTGO series as a stepping stone to get into ASA, ARCA, and NASCAR.

Art Frigo created the series with the help of Bob Roper and John McKarns.  He came up with the name by taking his first full name and the last two letters of his last name, coming up with the name ARTGO.  The first race was held on September 7, 1975, at the Grundy County Speedway in Morris, Illinois.  The inaugural Wayne Carter Classic was won by Tom Reffner.

Frigo sold the series to John & Sue McKarns in 1979.  In 1998 the McKarns licensed the name to NASCAR and NASCAR took full control of the series.  The series went through different name changes with different title sponsors, including the RE/MAX Challenge Series, International Truck & Engine Midwest Series, and finally the AutoZone Elite Division, Midwest Series.

Under the NASCAR era, the series had identical rules to three other NASCAR regional series (Northwest, Southeast and Southwest).  In 2006, after dwindling car counts and lack of races on the schedule NASCAR finally shut down the AutoZone Elite Division.

To replace the NASCAR Midwest Series, the ARCA Midwest Tour (ASA Midwest Tour 2007–2012) was created in 2007 by Racing Speed Associates, LLC as a new touring series that was similar in format to the former ARTGO Challenge Series. The ARTGO series had drivers like Paul Menard, Matt Kenseth (2003 NASCAR Sprint Cup Series Champion), Butch Miller, Dick Trickle, Joe Shear, Jim Sauter, Eddie Hoffman, Steve Carlson, Kevin Cywinski, Jim Weber, Justin Diercks, Tim Schendel, Jason Schuler and Jeff Frederickson.

Past ASA/ARCA Midwest Tour Champions 
2017 Ty Majeski
2016 Ty Majeski
2015 Ty Majeski
2014 Ty Majeski
2013 Dan Fredrickson
2012 Jonathan Eilen
2011 Andrew Morrissey
2010 Steve Carlson
2009 Steve Carlson
2008 Dan Fredrickson
2007 Nathan Haseleu

Past NASCAR/Midwest Champions 

2006 Tim Schendel
2005 Justin Diercks
2004 Justin Diercks
2003 Steve Carlson
2002 Steve Carlson
2001 Steve Carlson
2000 Steve Carlson
1999 Brian Hoppe
1998 Steve Carlson

Past ARTGO Champions 

1997 Eddie Hoffman
1996 Steve Carlson
1995 Kevin Cywinski
1994 Steve Carlson
1993 Jim Weber
1992 Jim Weber
1991 Steve Carlson
1990 Steve Carlson
1989 Joe Shear
1988 Butch Miller
1987 Dick Trickle
1986 Joe Shear
1985 Dick Trickle
1984 Dick Trickle
1983 Dick Trickle
1982 Jim Sauter
1981 Jim Sauter
1980 Dick Trickle
1979 Dick Trickle
1978 Tom Reffner
1977 Dick Trickle
1976 Dave Watson
1975 Tom Reffner

External links
NASCAR Touring Series
Phil Pash's World of Wheels
ARTGO Past Champions (Dick Trickle Tribute Website)
ARTGO Challenge Series (1975-1997) archive at The Third Turn
NASCAR Midwest Series (1998–2006) archive at The Third Turn
NASCAR Midwest Series (1998–2006) archive at Racing-Reference

Stock car racing series in the United States
NASCAR series
Sports in the Midwestern United States
Recurring events established in 1975
Organizations disestablished in 2006